Bounda is a town in central Ivory Coast. It is a sub-prefecture of Bouaké Department in Gbêkê Region, Vallée du Bandama District. The town is about two kilometres north of the border of Lacs District.

Bounda was a commune until March 2012, when it became one of 1126 communes nationwide that were abolished.

In 2014, the population of the sub-prefecture of Bounda was 10,088.

Villages
The 14 villages of the sub-prefecture of Bounda and their population in 2014 are:

Notes

Sub-prefectures of Gbêkê
Former communes of Ivory Coast